The 2018 Florida Launch season is the fifth season for the Florida Launch of Major League Lacrosse. The Launch are coming off their best year in franchise history, going 8-6 in 2017 and clinching the team's first ever playoff berth where they fell to the eventual champion Ohio Machine. They look to continue that success in 2018.

Offseason
September 5, 2017 - Chazz Woodson retires from Major League Lacrosse after 12 seasons of seven different teams, including the first Florida Launch playoff squad in 2017.
October 10 - Reigning Defensive Player of the Year Tucker Durkin signs a contract extension with the Launch through the 2018 season.

Schedule

Regular season

Standings

References

External links
 Team Website

Major League Lacrosse seasons
Florida Launch